"Dark Hollow" is a folk song first recorded by  folk singer-songwriter Bill Browning in 1958.  It is included as the B-side of his single "Borned with the Blues". Though usually credited to Browning, the song has some lyrical similarities to the traditional "East Virginia Blues/East Virginia" and "Come All You Fair and Tender Ladies", likely Browning's inspiration.

"Dark Hollow" is considered to be the most popular of Browning's short career, but it did not reach the peak of its popularity until it was recorded by Grateful Dead in the early 1970s. They began performing acoustic covers of the song in 1970. Electric covers soon followed in 1973 followed by more acoustic covers in 1980. In total, Grateful Dead performed "Dark Hollow" around 30 times.  Their version appears on History of the Grateful Dead, Volume One (Bear's Choice) and the live recording Reckoning.

Other renditions
Jimmie Skinnersingle (Dark Hollow / Walkin' My Blues Away) (1958)
Mac WisemanMac Wiseman (1967)
Ralph Stanley(1969)
Grateful Dead - History of the Grateful Dead, Volume One (Bear's Choice) (1973)
MuleskinnerMuleskinner (1974)
David BrombergMidnight on the Water (1975)
David GrismanEarly Dawg Recorded August of 1966; sung by Del McCoury
Amythyst KiahDig (2020)

References

1958 songs
1958 singles
Grateful Dead songs